Bruce George Gamble (May 24, 1938 – December 29, 1982) was a  professional ice hockey goaltender who played in the National Hockey League (NHL) between 1962 and 1972, with some stints in the minor leagues during that time.

Junior career
Gamble played three seasons with the Port Arthur Bruins of the Thunder Bay Junior A Hockey League between 1953 and 1955. In the 1955–56 season, he backstopped the Port Arthur North Stars to a berth in the Memorial Cup.   He did so again the following season with the Guelph Biltmores of the OHA, and was elected to the 1957 OHA first All-Star team.  He made it to the Memorial Cup a third time with the Hull-Ottawa Canadiens the following year.

Professional career and after
Gamble played his first year as a pro with the Vancouver Canucks of the WHL, and also played two games in the NHL for the New York Rangers. His performance impressed other NHL teams, and the Boston Bruins chose him in the 1959 intra-league draft. After a year with the Providence Reds in the AHL, Gamble became the team's starting goalie in 1960–61.  During the next four seasons he played mainly in the minors with the Portland Buckaroos, Kingston Frontenacs and Springfield Indians, and was called up by the Bruins for 28 games in 1961–62.

Gamble refused to go back to the minors in 1964–65, and so the Bruins suspended him from Springfield for the entire season.  The following year he was traded to the Toronto Maple Leafs.

In his first few seasons in Toronto, Gamble was a back-up to Hall of Famers Johnny Bower and Terry Sawchuk.   He recorded four shutouts in six games in March 1966. In 1966–67, when the Leafs won the Stanley Cup, he played in 23 regular season games and rang up a record of 5–10–4 and a GAA of 3.39.  However, he was sent to the minors to the Tulsa Oilers before the trading deadline; as a result, he did not spend the whole season with Toronto, and his name was left off the Stanley Cup.  With the loss of Sawchuk in the 1967 NHL expansion draft, Gamble saw more action with the Leafs and established himself as a solid, workhorse goalie.  He played in 41 games in 1967–68, 62 in 1968–69  and 52 in 1969–70.  He played in the 1968 NHL All-Star game and was named its Most Valuable Player.  He was the last Leaf goalie to play without a mask, finally donning one in 1970-71.  Gamble, along with a first-round selection (Pierre Plante) in the 1971 NHL Amateur Draft, was traded to the Philadelphia Flyers for Bernie Parent and a second-round pick (Rick Kehoe) in the same draft as part of a three-way deal which also involved the Boston Bruins on January 31, 1971. The Leafs also sent Mike Walton to the Bruins who shipped Rick MacLeish and Danny Schock to the Flyers.

Gamble served mainly as a back-up to Doug Favell with the Flyers for the rest of that season, appearing in 11 regular season games and two playoff games.   The following year he began to compete for the starting role.  He put in a run of solid performances which ended when he suffered a heart attack during a 3-1 victory over the Vancouver Canucks on February 8, 1972. Although he fell at one point during the game, he did not complain of problems until afterward, and traveled with the team to Oakland on February 9 for a game that evening against the California Golden Seals. As his chest pains continued, Gamble was admitted to an Oakland hospital where it was found that he had had a heart attack. Gamble did not play in the NHL again.

On December 29, 1982, after a practice session the evening before with an old-timers hockey team, the Niagara Falls Flames, Gamble woke up with chest pains, and died at a hospital in Niagara Falls, Ontario at the age of 44.

Urban legends regarding Gamble
Because Gamble suffered both heart attacks after playing or practicing hockey, accounts have been written that he was taken to a hospital during the 1972 NHL game, or that he "died during an old-timers game".  Neither of Gamble's heart attacks forced him from the ice; he finished the game after the first attack and suffered the second one the morning after a practice session.

Career statistics

Regular season and playoffs

References

External links
 
 

1938 births
1982 deaths
Boston Bruins players
Canadian expatriate ice hockey players in the United States
Canadian ice hockey goaltenders
Guelph Biltmore Mad Hatters players
Ice hockey people from Ontario
New York Rangers players
Philadelphia Flyers players
Philadelphia Flyers scouts
Portland Buckaroos players
Providence Reds players
Rochester Americans players
Sportspeople from Thunder Bay
Springfield Indians players
Stanley Cup champions
Toronto Maple Leafs players
Tulsa Oilers (1964–1984) players
Vancouver Canucks (WHL) players